Phillip Charles Bowler (born March 2, 1948, New York City) is an American jazz double-bassist and radio host.

Career
Bowler attended the University of Hartford, where he received a bachelor's degree in music in 1972. He played with Roland Kirk from 1976–78, then with Hugh Masekela (1980), Joe Lee Wilson (1981), Wynton Marsalis (1982–83), Max Roach (1983), Big Nick Nicholas (1983-85), Slide Hampton, Jon Faddis (1984–89), and Ralph Peterson, Jr. (1987-1996). He played in a quintet with Donald Harrison and Terence Blanchard in 1984–85, touring in Europe with Benny Golson. He recorded with Carla White in 1988 and Sal Salvador in 1989, and led a quartet called Pocket Jungle in 1991. From 1990 to 1997 he played in another group led by Donald Harrison and worked with Jackie McLean in 1997–99. He and Newman Taylor Baker played in a duo in 1997, and in 1998 he worked in the Count Basie Orchestra.

Bowler hosted Jazz Adventures on WPKN radio in Bridgeport, Connecticut, and performed with Artt Frank and Mike Armando from 1999–2009. In 2002 Bowler hosted the MJA Jazz & Blues Festival at Lake Grove, Long Island, New York.

Discography

As leader
 Pocket Jungle (Zoho, 2014)

As sideman
With Artt Frank & Pat Morrissey
 Waltz for Sharon Stone (MJA, 1997)
 Souvenir (MJA, 1999)

With Donald Harrison, Terence Blanchard
 Nascence (CBS, 1986)
 Discernment (King, Concord Jazz 1986)
 Indian Blues (Candid, 1992)

With Rahsaan Roland Kirk
 Boogie-Woogie String Along for Real (Warner Bros., 1978)
 Paris 1976 (Royal Jazz, 1990)
 Simmer, Reduce, Garnish and Serve/The Warner Bros. Recordings (Warner Archives, 1995)

With Ralph Peterson
 V (Blue Note, 1988)
 Triangular (Blue Note, 1989)
 Volition (Blue Note, 1990)
 Art (Blue Note, 1993)

With others
 Cherish the Ladies, The Girls Won't Leave the Boys Alone (Windham Hill, 2001)
 Dr. John, Funky New Orleans (Metro, 2000)
 Jon Faddis, Into the Faddisphere (Epic, 1989)
 Lightnin' Hopkins, Lightnin's Boogie (Justin Time, 2016)
 Branford Marsalis, Scenes in the City (Columbia, 1984)
 Wynton Marsalis, Think of One (CBS, 1983)
 Jackie McLean, Fire & Love (Somethin' Else, 1997)
 Big Nick Nicholas, Big and Warm (India Navigation, 1983)
 Max Roach, Live at Vielharmonie (Soul Note, 1985)
 Sal Salvador, Crystal Image (Stash, 1989)
 Carla White, Mood Swings (Milestone, 1988)

References

Gary W. Kennedy, "Phil Bowler". Grove Jazz online.

1948 births
Living people
Musicians from New York (state)
University of Hartford alumni
21st-century American male musicians
21st-century double-bassists
American jazz double-bassists
Male double-bassists
American male jazz musicians